Mahoba is a genus of moths in the subfamily Lymantriinae. The genus was erected by Frederic Moore in 1879.

Species
Mahoba plagidotata Walker, 1862
Mahoba irrorata  Moore, 1879

References

Moore, Frederic (1879). In Hewitson & Moore Descriptions of New Indian Lepidopterous Insects from the Collection of the Late Mr. W.S. Atkinson: 52.

Lymantriinae
Moth genera